"Al-Ra'i wal Nisaa", (meaning in English: The Shepherd and the Women), is a 1991 Egyptian drama/romance movie, starring Soad Hosni, Yousra and Ahmed Zaki.

Plot
The story of three women living alone in the desert, but a day they are visited by a young handsome man.

Cast
 Ahmed Zaki
 Souad Hosni as Wafa.
 Yousra
 Mirna

Awards
"1991: "Best Actress Award" for Souad Hosni. Egyptian Cinema Association, Egypt."
"1980: "Best Actress Award" for Souad Hosni. Alexandria International Film Festival, Egypt."

See also 
 Egyptian films of the 1990s
 List of Egyptian films of 1991

References
" Shepherd and the women", ( "Al-Rai' wal-Nisaa" in 1991),

Egyptian romantic drama films
1991 films